Parque Viva is a sporting and entertainment center located in Alajuela, Costa Rica.

Parque Viva is the first entertainment center in Central America. The park spanned over a total area of 30,000 square meters, includes Coca-Cola Amphitheater, Circuit Go Rigo Go, and Centro Printea. The park offers space for 4,000 parking spaces. Parque Viva was built around the defunct race track Autódromo La Guácima. The capacity of the amphitheater is 16,000. The first concert held in the amphitheatre was by the Orquesta Filarmónica de Costa Rica during its grand opening.

Concerts
The following is a list of concerts, showing date, artist or band, tour, opening acts, attendance and revenue.

References

External links
Official website

Music venues in Costa Rica